Veronika Makai (born 10 September 1994 in Orosháza) is a Hungarian handball goalkeeper.

She joined DVSC in the summer of 2011 for the invitation of former DVSC great and youth coach Erika Csapó. After 4 seasons, she left the team in 2015.

References

1994 births
Living people
People from Orosháza
Hungarian female handball players
Sportspeople from Békés County